Thalia, Thalía, Thaleia or Thalian may refer to:

People
 Thalia (given name), including a list of people with the name
 Thalía (born 1971), Mexican singer and actress

Mythological and fictional characters
 Thalia (Grace), one of the three Graces (Charities)
 Thalia (Muse), the muse of comedy and idyllic poetry
 Thalia (Nereid), one of the fifty daughters of Nereus and Doris
 Thalia (nymph), daughter of Hephaestus, and minor goddess of vegetation
 Thalia Menninger, a fictional character from the TV series The Many Loves of Dobie Gillis
 Thalia Grace, in mythology novels by Rick Riordan

Places
 Thalia, Victoria, Australia
 Thalia, Texas, U.S.
 Thalia, Virginia, U.S.

Arts and entertainment
 Thalia Awards, issued by the Czech Actors' Association 
 Thalia (magazine), a former German magazine 
 Thalia, a book by Arius in the 1st century AD
The Muse Thalia, a painting by Michele Pannonio c. 1546 
 Thalía (1990 album), by Thalía
 Thalía (2002 album), by Thalía
 Thalía (2013 album), by Thalía
 Thalía (English-language album), by Thalía, 2003

Flora and fauna
 Thalia (tunicate), a genus of marine invertebrate animals
 Thalia (plant), a plant genus 
 Thalia's shrew, a species of mammal

Other uses
 Thalia (bookstore), in Germany, Switzerland and Austria
 23 Thalia, an asteroid
 HMS Thalia, the name of three ships of the Royal Navy
 MV Thalia, the name of two German ships
 Renault Thalia, a version of the Renault Clio car
 Thalia, another name for the Trebbiano grape
 The Thalians, American mental health organization

See also 

 Talia (disambiguation)
 Thalia Hall, in Sibiu, Romania
 Thalia Hall (Chicago), U.S.
 Thalian Hall, Wilmington, North Carolina, U.S.
 Thalia Theatre (disambiguation)
 Thaleia, a genus of gastropods